DirectGroup Bertelsmann was a division of Bertelsmann AG and operated book sales clubs, online shops, bookstore chains and publishers in 8 countries when it was disbanded as a division in 2011.

Its more than 15 million customers have generated sales of €1.245 billion in 2009. The company was formed in July 2000 and was led by CEO Fernando Carro.

Management 
The Direct Group Executive Board consisted of: 
 Fernando Carro (Chief Executive Officer)
 Gerd Bührig (Executive Vice President)
 Niklas Darijtschuk (Chief Financial Officer)
 Jörg Hagen (French-speaking countries)

Bertelsmann subsidiaries
Mass media companies of Germany
Book publishing companies of Germany
Publishing companies established in 2000
Mass media in Gütersloh